Lorne O. Clarke,  (November 22, 1928 – May 21, 2016) was a Canadian lawyer and Chief Justice of the Nova Scotia Supreme Court.

Early life and education
Born in Malagash, Nova Scotia, in 1928, he graduated from Dalhousie University with a B.A. in 1949 and an LL.B. in 1951. In 1955, he  received an LL.M. from Harvard University. He was admitted to the bar in 1953.

Career
He was a member of the Faculty of Law of Dalhousie University from 1952 to 1959. From 1959 to 1981, he practised law in Truro, Nova Scotia. He was appointed Queen's Counsel in 1969.

In 1981, he was made a Judge of the Supreme Court of Nova Scotia, Trial Division. On August 22, 1985, he became the twentieth Chief Justice since the founding of the Nova Scotia Supreme Court in 1754. He retired in 1998. From 1998 to 1999, he was the Chair of the Memorial Advisory Committee of Swissair Flight 111.

In 1999, he was made an Officer of the Order of Canada. In 2002, he was awarded the Order of Nova Scotia.

He died on May 21, 2016 in Halifax.

Personal life
He married Mary Louise MacLeod on August 22, 1959 at St.Andrews Presbyterian Church in Pictou, NS. They had three children: Nora, George and Colin.

References

1928 births
2016 deaths
Canadian legal scholars
Canadian people of British descent
Canadian Presbyterians
Dalhousie University alumni
Schulich School of Law alumni
Harvard Law School alumni
Members of the Order of Nova Scotia
Judges in Nova Scotia
Officers of the Order of Canada
People from Colchester County

People from Cumberland County, Nova Scotia
Canadian King's Counsel